Government Lawngtlai College is the only institute of higher education in Lawngtlai district of  Mizoram, northeast India. It was established by public demand in 1980 in Lawngtlai. It became a government college under the Government of Mizoram in 1988.

The college is a branch member of the Mizoram College Teachers' Association, and the Red Ribbon Club of the Mizoram State AIDS Control Society.

History 
Government Lawngtlai College was established by the people of Lai Autonomous District Council in 1980. It was upgraded to deficit status on 1 July 1988. It was originally affiliated to the North Eastern Hill University, but the jurisdiction was transferred to Mizoram University, when the university was established in 2001. It is recognised by the University Grants Commission (India).

Location
Government Lawngtlai College is located in the southern region of Mizoram, 300 km away from Aizawl, the capital city of the state. The college is ideally situated on a hillock within Lawngtlai town. It has an approach road of 700 m (approximately) branching off the main National Highway No. 54.

Departments
Department of English
Department of History
Department of Geography
Department of Education
Department of Political Science
Department of Economics
Department of Public Administration
Department of Sociology
Department of Mizo

References

External links
 

Universities and colleges in Mizoram
Colleges affiliated to Mizoram University